Anthony Walters (born 7 March 1953) is an Australian former cricketer. He played one List A match for Tasmania in 1980/81.

See also
 List of Tasmanian representative cricketers

References

External links
 

1953 births
Living people
Australian cricketers
Tasmania cricketers
Cricketers from Tasmania